Acacia xiphophylla, commonly known as snakewood or snake-wood, is a tree in the family Fabaceae that is endemic to Western Australia. The indigenous group the Martuthunira, Ngarluma and Yindjibarndi peoples know it as marrawa, the Kariyarra know it as puluru and the Jiwarli know it as pukarti.

Description
Snakewood grows as a bushy, spreading tree or shrub, usually with two or three main gnarled trunks. The main branches usually appear to be contorted and widely spreading and have glabrous to sparingly finely pubescent branchlets. Like most Acacia species, it has phyllodes rather than true leaves. These are bluish grey in colour and have an elliptic or ligulate shape that tapers to the apex. It flowers shortly after rains. Flowers have been collected between January and May and August and September. The rudimentary inflorescences occur singly or in pairs in the axils. The seed pods that form after flowering are linear and raised over the seeds.

The wood of other trees with wavy grain or wavy coloration has also been called snakewood.

A. xiphophylla is a slow-growing and long-lived species that regenerates exclusively from seeds and will not form root suckers.

Taxonomy
The species was first formally described by Georg August Pritzel in 1904 as part of the work by Ptritzel and Ludwig Diels Fragmenta Phytographiae Australiae occidentalis. Beitrage zur Kenntnis der Pflanzen Westaustraliens, ihrer Verbreitung und ihrer Lebensverhaltnisse as published in Botanische Jahrbücher für Systematik, Pflanzengeschichte und Pflanzengeographie. It was reclassified as Racosperma xiphophyllum in 2003 by Leslie Pedley then transferred back to genus Acacia in 2006.
The specific epithet is taken from the Greek words xiphos meaning sword and phyllon meaning leaf in reference to the shape of the phyllodes.
The plant is similar in appearance to Acacia intorta and Acacia eremaea and is thought to be closely related on Acacia hamersleyensis.

Distribution
It occurs on saline semi-arid land in the Gascoyne River and Ashburton catchments east and north of Carnarvon in the Gascoyne and Pilbara regions of Western Australia on plains, rocky clay flats and stony creek beds as a part of Acacia shrubland and low woodland communities where they can sometimes dominate.

See also
List of Acacia species

References 

 

Acacias of Western Australia
xiphophylla
Fabales of Australia
Taxa named by Ernst Pritzel
Plants described in 1904